Panoramix  may refer to:

 Panoramix, the original French name for the druid character in the Asterix stories, named Getafix in English translations
 PanoramiX, was the original name of the Xinerama extension to the X Window System
 35268 Panoramix, a minor planet